Bojan Čukić (born 5 February 1988) is a Serbian professional footballer who plays as a defensive midfielder.

A product of the Partizan youth system, Čukić failed to make a single appearance for the club.

External links
 
 
 

Association football midfielders
CS Gaz Metan Mediaș players
Expatriate footballers in Austria
Expatriate footballers in Montenegro
Expatriate footballers in Romania
Expatriate footballers in Slovakia
FC VSS Košice players
FK Banat Zrenjanin players
FK Borac Čačak players
FK Javor Ivanjica players
FK Kolubara players
FK Metalac Gornji Milanovac players
FK Moravac Mrštane players
FK Partizan players
FK Radnik Surdulica players
FK Sloga Petrovac na Mlavi players
FK Smederevo players
FK Teleoptik players
Favoritner AC players
Footballers from Belgrade
Montenegrin First League players
OFK Grbalj players
Serbian expatriate footballers
Serbian expatriate sportspeople in Austria
Serbian expatriate sportspeople in Montenegro
Serbian expatriate sportspeople in Romania
Serbian expatriate sportspeople in Slovakia
Serbian First League players
Serbian footballers
Serbian SuperLiga players
Austrian Landesliga players
Slovak Super Liga players
1988 births
Living people